The men's 1500 metres race of the 2014–15 ISU Speed Skating World Cup 1, arranged in the Meiji Hokkaido-Tokachi Oval, in Obihiro, Japan, was held on 16 November 2014.

The competition saw an all-Dutch podium, as Kjeld Nuis of won, followed by Wouter olde Heuvel of in second place, and Koen Verweij in third place. Li Bailin of China won Division B.

Results
The race took place on Sunday, 16 November, with Division B scheduled in the morning session, at 11:25, and Division A scheduled in the afternoon session, at 15:23.

Division A

Division B

References

Men 1500
1